The Chrysauginae are a subfamily of snout moths (family Pyralidae). They are primarily Neotropical and include about 400 described species.

Description and ecology
The subfamily includes the sloth moths (genera Cryptoses, Bradypodicola and Bradypophila). The caterpillar larvae of these species feed on the dung of sloths, and adults live in the sloths' fur. Other unusual Chrysauginae caterpillars have been found in Hymenoptera nests and on the spines of caterpillars of the brush-footed butterfly genus Automeris. But usually, their larvae feed on plants, boring into seed, fruits, stems and roots, or rolling and spinning leaves together to form a hideout.

While the adults are fairly nondescript, Chrysauginae larvae can usually be recognized unequivocally by the sclerotised ring around seta SD1 of the metathorax.

Systematics
In 1995, Solis et al. compiled a checklist of Chrysauginae for the Western Hemisphere. However, phylogenetic analyses have not been conducted. Shaffer et al. tentatively placed four Australian genera in the subfamily in 1996; research on the adults failed to support this, and larvae are unknown.

Abaera Walker, 1859
Acallidia Schaus, 1913
Acallis Ragonot, 1891
Acutia Ragonot, 1891
Adenopteryx Ragonot, 1891
Ahyalosticta Amsel, 1956
Anassodes Turner, 1932
Anemosa Walker, 1859 (= Drymiarcha Meyrick, 1885)
Anemosella Dyar, 1914 (= Balidarcha Dyar, 1914)
Anisothrix Ragonot, 1891
Arbinia Möschler, 1881
Area Ragonot, 1891
Arouva Walker, 1864
Arta Grote, 1875 (= Xantippides Dyar, 1908)
Azamora Walker, 1858 (= Amblyura Lederer, 1863, Arica Walker, 1863, Thylacophora Ragonot, 1891, Torda Walker, 1863)
Basacallis Cashatt, 1969
Bisinusia Amsel, 1956
Blepharocerus C. É. Blanchard, 1852 (= Blepharocorus C. É. Blanchard, 1852)
Bonchis Walker, 1862 (= Ethnistis Lederer, 1863, Gazaca Walker, 1866, Vurna Walker, 1866, Zarania Walker, 1866)
Bradypodicola Spuler, 1906
Bradypophila Ihering, 1914
Callasopia Möschler, 1890
Caphys Walker, 1863 (= Euexippe Ragonot, 1891, Ugra Walker, 1863)
Cappsia Pastrana, 1953
Carcha Walker, 1859 (= Coeloma Möschler, 1890)
Casuaria Walker, 1866 (= Saccopleura Ragonot, 1891)
Catadupa Walker, 1863
Chenevadia Dyar, 1914
Chrysauge Hübner, 1823 (= Candisa Walker, 1866)
Chrysophila Hübner, 1831 (= Eurypta Lederer, 1863)
Clydonopteron N. D. Riley, 1880
Condylolomia Grote, 1873 (= Cordylolomia Rye, 1875)
Craftsia Dyar, 1914
Cromarcha Dyar, 1914
Cryptoses Dyar, 1908
Cyclidalis Hampson, 1906
Cyclopalpia Hampson, 1897
Dastira Walker, 1859
Dasycnemia Ragonot, 1891 (= Hyalosticta Hampson, 1897, Potosa Capps, 1952)
Deopteryx Dyar, 1914
Derbeta Walker, 1866
Diloxis Hampson, 1897
Distortia Amsel, 1956
Drepanodia Ragonot, 1892
Eobrena Dyar, 1914
Epidelia Ragonot, 1891
Epiparachma Amsel, 1956
Epitamyra Ragonot, 1891
Erioptycha Ragonot, 1891
Eupilocera Dognin, 1909
Galasa Walker, 1866 (= Cordylopeza Zeller, 1873)
Galasodes Amsel, 1956
Gephyra Walker, 1859 (= Replicia Dyar, 1914)
Gephyrella Dyar, 1914
Hednotodes Lower, 1893 (= Calliphlycta Hampson, 1918)
Heliades Ragonot, 1891
Heterauge Hampson, 1906
Holoperas Warren, 1891
Humiphila Becker, 1974
Hyperparachma Warren, 1891 (= Parachmopsis Amsel, 1956)
Hypocosmia Ragonot, 1891
Idnea Herrich-Schäffer, 1858 (= Auchoteles Zeller, 1877, Corybissa Walker, 1863, Uzeda Walker, 1863)
Idneodes Ragonot, 1892
Itambe Ragonot, 1892
Lepidomys Guenée, 1852 (= Chalinitis Ragonot, 1891)
Lophopleura Ragonot, 1891
Lophopleuropsis Amsel, 1956
Martiniodes Amsel, 1956
Megacaphys Hampson, 1916
Michaelshaffera Solis, 1998
Microrca Amsel, 1956
Microsauge Amsel, 1956
Microzancla Hampson, 1897
Mimetauge Munroe, 1970
Monoloxis Hampson, 1897
Murgisca Walker, 1863 (= Pachymorphus Möschler, 1890)
Myolisa Dyar, 1914
Nachaba Walker, 1859 (= Ascha Walker, 1864)
Navura Schaus, 1913
Negalasa Barnes & McDunnough, 1913
Neocaphys Amsel, 1956
Ocoba Dyar, 1914
Ocresia Ragonot, 1891
Oectoperodes Ragonot, 1892
Oedmatodes Ragonot, 1892 (= Oedematodes Hampson, 1897)
Ophias Ragonot, 1891
Oryctopleura Ragonot, 1891
Pachypalpia Hampson, 1895
Pachypodistes Hampson, 1905 (= Conotambe Dyar, 1914)
Parachma Walker, 1866 (= Artopsis Dyar, 1908, Perseistis Strand, 1921, Perseis Ragonot, 1891, Zazaca Walker, 1866)
Paragalasa Cashatt, 1969
Paramacna Warren, 1889 (= Acroppterygella Strand, 1917, Acropterygella Neave, 1939, Acropteryx Ragonot, 1891)
Parasopia Möschler, 1890
Paridnea Ragonot, 1892 (= Batia Walker, 1867)
Passelgis Dyar, 1914
Pelasgis Ragonot, 1891
Penthesilea Ragonot, 1891
Pionidia Hampson, 1897
Plagerepne Tams, 1926
Polloccia Dyar, 1910 (= Pollocia Neave, 1940)
Polyterpnes Turner, 1932
Protrichia Hampson, 1897
Psectrodes Ragonot, 1891
Pyrauge Hampson, 1906
Pyraustodes Ragonot, 1891
Quadrischistis Amsel, 1956
Ramphidium Geyer in Hübner, 1837 (= Acrodegmia Ragonot, 1891)
Rhynchotosale Hampson, 1916
Rucuma Walker, 1863
Salobrena Walker, 1863 (= Ballonicha Möschler, 1886, Oectoperia Zeller, 1875, Salobrana Fernald, 1902, Teucronoma Meyrick, 1936)
Samcova Walker, 1863
Sanguesa Walker, 1863
Sarcistis Hampson, 1897
Satole Dyar, 1908
Schistoneura Ragonot, 1891
Semnia Hübner, 1823 (= Acronolepia Westwood, 1835, Episemnia Ragonot, 1891)
Speosia Schaus, 1913
Sthenobaea Ragonot, 1891 (= Parabaera Dognin, 1904, Sthenauge Hampson, 1906)
Streptopalpia Hampson, 1895
Tamyra Herrich-Schäffer, 1858 (= Lametia Walker, 1859, Tamyrodes Ragonot, 1891)
Tetraschistis Hampson, 1897
Tharsanthes Meyrick, 1936
Thermotesia Hampson, 1916
Tippecoa Dyar, 1914
Torotambe Dyar, 1914
Tosale Walker, 1863 (= Fabatana Walker, 1866, Restidia Dyar, 1914, Siparocera Grote, 1875, Callocera Grote, 1875, Siparocera Robinson, 1876, Uliosoma Warren, 1891)
Ungulopsis Amsel, 1956
Voglia Amsel, 1956
Xantippe Ragonot, 1891
Zaboba Dyar, 1914
Zamanna Dyar, 1914
Zanclodes Ragonot, 1891

References

 Savela, Markku (2011): Markku Savela's Lepidoptera and Some Other Life Forms: Chrysauginae. Version of March 7, 2011. Retrieved May, 2011.
 Solis, M. Alma (2007): Phylogenetic studies and modern classification of the Pyraloidea (Lepidoptera). Revista Colombiana de Entomología 33(1): 1–8 [English with Spanish abstract]. HTML fulltext

 
Pyralidae of South America
Moths of South America
Moth subfamilies